Cleora tora is a moth of the  family Geometridae. It is known from northern Madagascar.

It has a wingspan between 21–31 mm and is close to Cleora proemia Prout, 1917  in some details of structure.

References

Cleora
Moths described in 1926
Moths of Madagascar